Cleveland High School is a public high school located in the city of Cleveland, Texas, USA and classified as a 6A school by the UIL.  It is a part of the Cleveland Independent School District located in northwestern Liberty County.   In 2015, the school was rated "Met Standard" by the Texas Education Agency.

Athletics
The Cleveland Indians compete in these sports - 

Cross country, basketball, football, volleyball, track, baseball, soccer, and softball.

State Titles
Boys Basketball 
1986(3A)

References

External links
Cleveland Independent School District

Schools in Liberty County, Texas
Public high schools in Texas